Caledyschirius is a genus of beetles in the family Carabidae, containing the following species:

 Caledyschirius baehri Bulirsch, 2010
 Caledyschirius bicolor Bulirsch, 2010
 Caledyschirius burwelli Bulirsch, 2010
 Caledyschirius monteithi Bulirsch, 2010
 Caledyschirius rufithorax Bulirsch, 2010

References

Scaritinae